The Dance and Drama Awards are a scholarship scheme which subsidises professional vocational training at some of the leading performing arts schools in the United Kingdom. Established in 1998, the awards are funded and regulated by the British Government through the Learning and Skills Council and are awarded to selected students at 21 specialist performing arts institutions.

Overview
Dance and Drama Awards are offered to selected students, who are commencing training at the 21 specialist vocational schools chosen for the scheme.  Through a process of auditions, the awarding school will identify the most talented students and allocate awards appropriately. The award pays a substantial contribution towards the cost of attending the relevant course and in many cases, also includes a means tested maintenance grant.

Courses
The vocational courses for which the awards are given are specially devised by Trinity College, London and, upon completion, provide a professional level qualification at either Level 5 or Level 6 on the National Qualifications Framework.  Completion of one of these courses gives formal accreditation of the skills, knowledge and understanding that are acquired in training for employment as a professional actor, dancer, performing artist or in production roles supporting performance. Despite the fact that despite the courses being offered as post-16 further education, the qualifications are actually rated at graduate level.

Courses which are eligible for funding:

National Qualifications Framework – Level 5
National Certificate in Professional Acting
National Certificate in Professional Classical Ballet

National Qualifications Framework – Level 6
National Diploma in Professional Acting
National Diploma in Professional Musical Theatre
National Diploma in Professional Dance
National Diploma in Professional Production Skills

Schools 
All the schools which participate in the Dance & Drama Awards scheme are validated by Trinity College and are inspected for educational standards by OFSTED. They are some of the top performing arts training establishments in the UK.  

Schools validated to provide the qualifications are:

Academy of Live and Recorded Arts
ArtsEd, London
Tring Park School for the Performing Arts, Tring Park
Bird College of Dance, Music & Theatre Performance
Cambridge Performing Arts at Bodywork
Drama Studio London
Elmhurst Ballet School
English National Ballet School
GSA Conservatoire
The Hammond School
Italia Conti Academy of Theatre Arts
Laine Theatre Arts
Liverpool Theatre School and College
Millennium Dance 2000
Mountview Academy of Theatre Arts
Northern Ballet School
Oxford School of Drama
Performers College
SLP College Leeds
Stella Mann College
Urdang Academy

Eligibility
There are no prerequisites for receiving a Dance and Drama Award.  They are awarded based solely on talent and ability, therefore they are not subject to means testing of the student's financial status.  The only restriction on who is eligible to receive an award is that recipients must be between the ages of 16 and 23 and must have been resident in the United Kingdom or the European Union for a minimum of 3 years prior to the commencement of the course.

Notable recipients 
 Connie Fisher, winner of BBC1 talent show How Do You Solve a Problem Like Maria?
 Dominic Burgess, stage and television actor
 Ryan J. Brown, actor and screenwriter

References

Education finance in the United Kingdom
Performing arts education in the United Kingdom
British awards
Dance awards
British drama
1998 establishments in the United Kingdom
Awards established in 1998